David Young (1844 - 1913) was a Wesleyan minister and historian.

Young was born on 3 November 1844, near Haverfordwest, later moving with his family to Pontlottyn.  In 1893 Young published The Origin and History of Methodism in Wales, a history of Wesleyanism in the country.  David Young died on 4 August 1913, at Margate.

References 

19th-century Welsh historians
Wesleyan ministers
19th-century Welsh clergy
20th-century Welsh clergy
1844 births
1913 deaths